The term metropolitan borough was used from 1900 to 1965, for the subdivisions of the County of London and were created by the London Government Act 1899.

History
Parliamentary boroughs covering the metropolitan area were created in 1832. They were Finsbury, Greenwich, Lambeth, Marylebone, Southwark, Tower Hamlets and Westminster. Soon after their creation it was proposed that they should be incorporated for local government purposes and this was also a finding of the Royal Commission on the City of London, but this did not happen.

The metropolitan boroughs were created in 1900 by the London Government Act 1899 which created 28 metropolitan boroughs as sub-divisions of the County of London. Their borough councils replaced vestries and district boards as the second tier of local government.

Some boroughs were formed as amalgamations of parishes, but most were continuations of existing units of local government, with the parish vestry or district board elevated to a borough council. With the creation of the boroughs, the opportunity was taken to correct a number of boundary anomalies. All civil parishes in the County of London continued to exist, although their role was reduced to administration of the New Poor Law and they were amalgamated over time to become aligned with the boroughs.

In 1965 the County of London was abolished by the London Government Act 1963 and replaced with the much larger Greater London. The 28 metropolitan boroughs were also abolished and merged to create 12 of the 32 larger London boroughs and are also known as Inner London boroughs.

List of boroughs
They were the following, all in the County of London, created in 1900, and abolished in 1965:

No. 1 on the map indicates the City of London. This was not a metropolitan borough, nor was it part of the County of London. It predated the metropolitan boroughs, was not abolished in 1965, and is still in existence.

References

Further reading
 

 

Defunct types of subdivision in the United Kingdom